The  African Index Medicus  (AIM) is an international database to African health literature implemented by World Health Organization (WHO) and African partners. AIM makes available (on line) health information produced on Africa or by African researchers  for health workers, policy makers and communities.

Background
Establishing a regional database of health literature published in Africa (an African Index Medicus) was mandated by the Regional Committee by resolution AFR/RC30R5. In 1984, the work began on developing the database in AFRO but for various reasons was subsequently suspended.

The project was relaunched in 1993 following a consultation in Accra, Ghana, among African Health information professionals, members of the Executive Committee of the Association for Health Information and Libraries in Africa (AHILA). and WHO technical staff.

Objectives
The major objective of the AIM project is to provide access to information published in or related to Africa and to encourage local publishing. It aims to collect references of published and non-published health information relevant to the Region and not indexed elsewhere. The major challenges for this project are:

 To promote African publishing by encouraging writers to publish in their countries or regional journals
 To give greater visibility to health and biomedical research carried out in African countries
 To strengthen the South-South flow of information, especially among African countries
 To reduce the cost of information access for developing countries
 To integrate the African publications into international information networks
 To develop and encourage collaboration and information sharing in the region

What is indexed in AIM?
 Grey literature
 Technical reports
 Theses and dissertations
 Medical journals (some with full articles)

Which journals are indexed in the AIM?
All African Medical journals could be indexed in the AIM database. Articles on or related to Africa and published in other regional or international journals are indexed.

Structure and management
The African Index Medicus Project is based at the World Health Organization Regional office for Africa. (Library) in Brazzaville, Congo. 
Data are provided by National focal points and African Medical Editors. Many of them are FAME (Forum of African Medical Editors) members. The information received by the IMA project team are indexed, cataloged, compiled and integrated into a database available on OPAC  accessible from the website of the African Index Medicus.

Partnership into international information networks
AIM is recognized by leading institutions and organizations as the main catalog of African health information. Therefore, the recommendations and / or referrals to the African Index Medicus, are present on the websites of many of these organizations, including international networks such as le CISMEF  (France), universities such as the Stanford University, University of Alberta. Also the African and Malagasy Council for Higher Education (CAMES) recommends that African researchers and scientists to publish in journals indexed IMA to ensure the credibility of their issue.

See also

 Index Medicus

References

External links
 Official Site
 Access the AIM database from WHO web site

Medical databases
World Health Organization
Organisations based in Brazzaville